The Moscow Armistice was signed between Finland on one side and the Soviet Union and United Kingdom on the other side on 19 September 1944, ending the Continuation War.  The Armistice restored the Moscow Peace Treaty of 1940, with a number of modifications.

The final peace treaty between Finland and many of the Allies was signed in Paris in 1947.

Conditions for peace 

The conditions for peace were similar to what had been agreed in the Moscow Peace Treaty of 1940:  Finland was obliged to cede parts of Karelia and Salla, as well as certain islands in the Gulf of Finland. The new armistice also handed all of Petsamo to the Soviet Union, and Finland was further compelled to lease Porkkala to the Soviet Union for a period of fifty years (the area was returned to Finnish control in 1956).

Other conditions included Finnish payment of nearly $300,000,000 ($ in today's US dollars) in the form of various commodities over six years to the Soviet Union as war reparations. Finland also agreed to legalise the Communist Party of Finland (after it had made some changes to the party rules) and ban parties that the Soviet Union considered fascist. Further, the individuals that the Soviets considered responsible for the war had to be arrested and put on trial, the best-known case being that of Risto Ryti.  The armistice compelled Finland to drive German troops from its territory, leading to a military campaign in Lapland.

See also
 Moscow Peace Treaty of 1940
 Allied Control Commission (Finland)
 Finlandization
 Armistice between Italy and Allied armed forces
 Bulgarian coup d'état of 1944
 King Michael's Coup
 Karelian question, contemporary debate on the status of the ceded territories

References

Further reading
 Malbone W. Graham. (1945). "Armistices – 1944 Style". The American Journal of International Law 39, 2: 286–95.

External links 
 Text of the Armistice Agreement.

Continuation War
Peace treaties of Finland
1944 in Finland
1944 in Russia
Treaties of the Soviet Union
Finland–Soviet Union relations
World War II treaties
Moscow (1944)
Treaties concluded in 1944
Treaties entered into force in 1944
September 1944 events
Events in Moscow
1944 in Moscow